Al Hassan Saleh (Arabic:الحسن صالح) (born 25 June 1991) is an Emirati footballer. He currently plays as a left back for Al-Sharjah.

External links

References

Emirati footballers
1991 births
Living people
Ras Al Khaimah Club players
Emirates Club players
Sharjah FC players
Place of birth missing (living people)
UAE First Division League players
UAE Pro League players
Association football fullbacks
2019 AFC Asian Cup players
United Arab Emirates international footballers